The following is a list of deaths in May 2009.

Entries for each day are listed alphabetically by surname. A typical entry lists information in the following sequence:

Name, age, country of citizenship at birth, subsequent country of citizenship (if applicable), reason for notability, cause of death (if known), and reference.

May 2009

1
Delara Darabi, 22, Iranian convicted murderer, executed by hanging.
Fred Delmare, 87, German actor, complications from pneumonia.
Ric Estrada, 81, Cuban-born American penciler of comic books, prostate cancer.
Danny Gans, 52, American entertainer.
Norman Gash, 97, British historian.
Brian Grove, 88, Aussie cricketer.
Albert Hamilton Gordon, 107, American businessman.
George Hannan, 98, Australian politician.
Jokke Kangaskorpi, 37, Finnish footballer.
Jack D. Maltester, 95, American politician, mayor of San Leandro, California.
Derek Noonan, 62, British rugby league and rugby union player.
Marc Rocco, 46, American film director (Murder in the First, Where the Day Takes You) and screenwriter.
Sunline, 13, New Zealand champion racehorse, euthanized.
John Wilke, 54, American investigative reporter, pancreatic cancer.

2
Alfred Appel, 75, American scholar, expert on Vladimir Nabokov, heart failure.
K. Balaji, 74, Indian Tamil actor and producer, multiple organ failure.
Augusto Boal, 78, Brazilian dramatist and theater director (Theatre of the Oppressed), respiratory failure. 
Víctor Andrés Catena, 84, Spanish screenwriter and director.
Marilyn French, 79, American writer, heart failure.
Harold Hankins, 78, British electrical engineer and academic administrator, Vice-Chancellor of UMIST.
Kiyoshiro Imawano, 58, Japanese rock musician.
Janus Kamban, 95, Faroese sculptor and graphic designer.
Jack Kemp, 73, American politician and football player, candidate for Vice President (1996), cancer.
Carole C. Noon, 59, American primatologist, founder of Save the Chimps, pancreatic cancer.
Robert Pauley, 85, American executive, President of ABC Radio (1961–1967), heart failure.
Virginia Prince, 96, American transgender activist.

3
Dobby Campbell, 86, Scottish football player (Chelsea, Scotland) and manager.
Robert B. Choate, Jr., 84, American food lobbyist.
Committed, 29, American thoroughbred racehorse, euthanized.
John Elsworthy, 77, Welsh football player (Ipswich Town).
Hui Ki On, 65, Hong Kong public servant, Commissioner of Police (1994–2001), cancer.
Eleanor Perenyi, 91, American gardener and writer, cerebral hemorrhage.
Ram Shewalkar, 78, Indian Marathi writer, cardiac arrest.
Ralph Thompson, 95, British animal artist.

4
Nicholas Clemente, 80, American judge (New York Supreme Court).
Dom DeLuise, 75, American actor and comedian (The Cannonball Run, The Secret of NIMH), writer and chef, kidney failure.
Sir Geoffrey Foot, 93, Australian politician.
Edward Stewart Kennedy, 97, American historian.
Charles Lugano, 59, Kenyan politician, after short illness.
Martha Mason, 71, American author, lived 60 years in an iron lung.
Fritz Muliar, 89, Austrian actor.
Jane Randolph, 93, American actress.
Gisela Stein, 73, German actress.

5
Benjamín Flores, 24, Mexican boxer, brain injury during a match.
David S. King, 91, American politician, U.S. Representative for Utah (1959–1963).
Richard Miller, 83, American operatic tenor and educator, Professor Emeritus of Voice (Oberlin Conservatory of Music).
Dewey Smith, 36, American diver.
Elsie B. Washington, 66, American author, wrote first African American romance novel, multiple sclerosis and cancer.
Murasaki Yamada, 60, Japanese manga artist.

6
Peyman Abadi, 37, Iranian actor, car accident.
Erik Bluemel, 32, American professor (University of Denver), bicycle accident.
Sam Cohn, 79, American talent agent, after short illness.
Leon Despres, 101, American attorney and politician, heart failure.
Ean Evans, 48, American bassist (Lynyrd Skynyrd), cancer.
Sima Eyvazova, 75, Azerbaijani diplomat, first Permanent Representative to the UN.
Kevin Grubb, 31, American NASCAR driver, suicide by gunshot.
Sid Laverents, 100, American amateur filmmaker, pneumonia.
Lev Losev, 71, Russian poet and literary critic.
Bob Meyer, 76, Australian logician, lung cancer.
W. Wesley Peterson, 85, American mathematician and computer scientist.
Valentin Varennikov, 85, Russian general.
Viola Wills, 69, American pop singer, cancer.

7
Robin Blaser, 83, American-born Canadian poet, Griffin Poetry Prize winner.
Mickey Carroll, 89, American actor (The Wizard of Oz).
Ian Cundy, 64, British Anglican prelate, Bishop of Peterborough, mesothelioma.
Linda Dangcil, 66, American actress (The Flying Nun), throat cancer.
John Furia, Jr., 79, American screenwriter (The Twilight Zone, Dr. Kildare), President of the Writers Guild, West (1973–1975).
Alan Gilbertson, 81, New Zealand cricketer.
Tony Marsh, 77, British racing driver.
David Mellor, 78, British industrial designer, manufacturer and retailer.
Frank Melton, 60, American politician, mayor of Jackson, Mississippi.
John Murphy, 95, Irish building contractor.
Danny Ozark, 85, American baseball manager.
Brian Sorenson, 79, New Zealand cricketer.
Wayland Young, 2nd Baron Kennet, 85, British politician and writer.

8
Gianni Baget Bozzo, 84, Italian Roman Catholic priest and politician.
Fons Brydenbach, 54, Belgian athlete, cancer.
Dom DiMaggio, 92, American baseball player (Boston Red Sox), brother of Joe DiMaggio, pneumonia.
Hideyuki Fujisawa, 83, Japanese Go player, aspiration pneumonia.
Carlos Kloppenburg, 89, Brazilian Roman Catholic prelate, Bishop of Novo Hamburgo (1986–1995).
Ninel Kurgapkina, 80, Russian prima ballerina, road accident.
Greg Palmer, 61, American writer, television reporter and Emmy Award-winning journalist, lung cancer.
Bud Shrake, 77, American journalist and novelist, lung cancer.
Eunice Taylor, 75, American baseball player (Kenosha Comets).

9
Eileen Albright, 81, American baseball player (AAGPBL)
Stephen Bruton, 60, American songwriter and guitarist (Kris Kristofferson band), throat cancer.
Chuck Daly, 78, American basketball coach, pancreatic cancer.
Travis Edmonson, 76, American singer-songwriter and guitarist (Bud & Travis), heart failure.
Michael Fox, 75, British-born Israeli lawyer.
Cyril Edwin Hart, 96, British forestry expert.
Henry T. King, 89, American attorney, Nuremberg trials prosecutor, cancer.
David Marcus, 85, Irish literary editor, after long illness.
Ernest Millington, 93, British politician and educator, last living World War II-era member of the British Parliament.
Eugene Smith, 88, American gospel singer.
Evgenios Spatharis, 85, Greek shadow play artist, fall.
Mendi Rodan, 80, Romanian-born Israeli conductor and violinist, cancer.
Jean-Claude Van Geenberghe, 46, Belgian-born Ukrainian equestrian.
George Zinkhan, 57, American academic and suspected murderer, suicide by gunshot.

10
Ibn al-Shaykh al-Libi, Libyan Al-Qaeda paramilitary trainer accused of terrorism, alleged suicide.
Robert John Cornell, 89, American politician and Roman Catholic priest, U.S. Representative from Wisconsin (1975–1979).
Sergio Escobedo, 78, Mexican Olympic modern pentathlete and fencer.
Johnnie Johnson, English cricketer.
James Kirkup, 91, British poet, translator and travel writer, stroke.
Rodrigo Rosenberg Marzano, 47, Guatemalan lawyer, shot.
Clive Scott, 64, British keyboardist and songwriter (Jigsaw), stroke.
Brian Simnjanovski, 27, American football player (Berlin Thunder), car accident.
Robert J. Sinclair, 77, American executive, CEO of Saab-Scania of America, cancer.

11
Pat Booth, 66, British model and writer, cancer.
Lude Check, 91, Canadian ice hockey player.
Abel Goumba, 82, Central African politician, Prime Minister (1957–1958, 1959, 2003) and vice-president (2003–2005).
Claudio Huepe, 69, Chilean politician and diplomat, heart attack.
Bill Kelso, 69, American baseball player.
Mark Landon, 60, American actor, adopted son of Michael Landon.
Shanthi Lekha, 79, Sri Lankan actress.
Antonio Lopes dos Santos, 92, Portuguese general, Governor of Macau (1962–1966), Cape Verde (1969–1974).
S. M. Nanda, 93, Indian admiral, Chief of Naval Staff (1970–1973).
Peter Philips, 81, Australian politician, Member of the New South Wales Legislative Council (1976–1988).
Sir Richard Posnett, 89, British colonial administrator, Governor of Belize (1972–1976) and Bermuda (1981–1983).
Leonard Shlain, 71, American surgeon and writer, brain cancer.

12
Christopher Bathurst, 3rd Viscount Bledisloe, 74, British aristocrat and politician, heart failure.
Dame Heather Begg, 76, New Zealand operatic soprano, leukemia.
Mohan Saliya Ellawala, 61, Sri Lankan politician, Governor of Sabaragamuwa Province (2008–2009), after long illness.
Eden Ross Lipson, 66, American book editor, pancreatic cancer.
Thomas Nordseth-Tiller, 28, Norwegian screenwriter (Max Manus), cancer.
Roger Planchon, 77, French theatre director, heart attack.
Sidique Ali Merican, 78, Malaysian sprinter, stroke.
Ted Sampley, 63, American POW/MIA activist, complications from heart surgery.
Antonio Vega, 51, Spanish pop singer-songwriter (Nacha Pop), pneumonia.
Heini Walter, 81, Swiss racing driver.

13
Frank Aletter, 83, American character actor (It's About Time), cancer.
Ron Cameron, 85, Canadian Olympic rower.Ron Cameron
Waldemar Levy Cardoso, 108, Brazilian Field Marshal, WWI-era veteran.
Achille Compagnoni, 94, Italian mountaineer, first person to ascend K2.
Don Cordner, 87, Australian footballer.
Rafael Escalona, 81, Colombian Vallenato composer and troubador.
Norbert Eschmann, 75, Swiss footballer.
Ernest Kline, 79, American politician, Lieutenant Governor of Pennsylvania (1971–1979).
Iwan Schmid, 61, Swiss Olympic cyclist.
Anne Scott-James, 96, British journalist and author, widow of Sir Osbert Lancaster.
L. William Seidman, 88, American public servant, Chairman of the FDIC (1985–1991), after short illness.
Joe Tandy, 26, British auto racing team owner, car crash.

14
Barathea, 19, Irish racehorse, euthanized.
Monica Bleibtreu, 65, Austrian actress, screenwriter and drama teacher, cancer.
Bob Boyd, 81, American football player.
Newt Heisley, 88, American commercial artist, designer of POW/MIA flag, after long illness.
Ken Hollyman, 86, Welsh footballer (Cardiff City, Newport County).
Marian McDougall, 95, American amateur golfer.
Buddy Montgomery, 79, American jazz musician, heart failure.
William J. Passmore, 77, American jockey, complications from emphysema.
Bob Rosburg, 82, American golfer and television color analyst, fall.
George Williams, 69, American baseball player.

15
Susanna Agnelli, 87, Italian politician and writer, Minister of Foreign Affairs (1995–1996).
Alexander Gordon Bearn, 86, British physician.
Broad Brush, 26, American thoroughbred racehorse, euthanized.
Si Frumkin, 78, Lithuanian-born Holocaust survivor.
Alan Hackney, 84, British screenwriter.
Mordechai Limon, 85, Israeli admiral, Commander of the Navy (1950–1954).
Cheikh Hamidou Kane Mathiara, 69, Senegalese economist and politician.
Rodger McFarlane, 54, American gay rights activist, first executive director of Gay Men's Health Crisis, suicide.
Mohammad-Amin Riahi, 86, Iranian historian and literary scholar.
Edwin S. Shneidman, 91, American suicidologist.
Helvi Sipilä, 94, Finnish diplomat.
Roy Talbot, 94, Bermudan calypso musician, last surviving member of original Talbot Brothers.
Bud Tingwell, 86, Australian actor, prostate cancer.
Wayman Tisdale, 44, American basketball player and jazz bassist, cancer.
Hubert van Es, 67, Dutch photographer at the fall of Saigon, brain hemorrhage.

16
Prospero Amatong, 77, Filipino politician, Congressman (1998–2007), Governor of Davao del Norte (1992–1998), fall.
Antonio Chocano, 96, Guatemalan Olympic fencer and diplomat, emphysema.
John E. Connelly, 82, American entrepreneur, founder of Gateway Clipper Fleet, heart failure.
Henry David Halsey, 90, British Anglican prelate, Bishop of Carlisle (1972–1989), after short illness.
Sándor Katona, 66, Hungarian footballer and Olympic champion.
Craig G. Roberts, 78, American racehorse trainer.
Peter Sampson, 81, British footballer (Bristol Rovers), Alzheimer's disease.

17
*Mohammad-Taqi Bahjat Foumani, 92, Iranian cleric, heart disease.
Mario Benedetti, 88, Uruguayan author and poet.
Daniel Carasso, 103, Greek-born French businessman (Groupe Danone).
Adolf Dickfeld, 99, German World War II Luftwaffe flying ace.
David Herbert Donald, 88, American historian, heart failure.
Murray Hamilton, 91, Australian politician, member of the Victorian Legislative Council (1967–1982).
Masaru Hayami, 84, Japanese public servant, Governor of the Bank of Japan (1998–2003), respiratory failure.
David Ireland, 78, American sculptor and conceptual artist, pneumonia.
* Jung Seung-hye, 44, South Korean film producer, colon cancer.
Guillermo Lora, 87, Bolivian revolutionary leader, liver cancer.
Dame Patricia Mackinnon, 97, Australian community worker and philanthropist, President of the Royal Children's Hospital.
Prakash Mehra, 69, Indian film producer and director, pneumonia and multiple organ failure.
William Moore, 60, British loyalist paramilitary, member of the Shankill Butchers, suspected heart attack.
Zdeněk Pospíšil, 84, Czech Olympic sprinter.
Peter Slabakov, 86, Bulgarian actor.
Ron Snidow, 67, American football player (Washington Redskins, Cleveland Browns), complications from Lou Gehrig's disease.
Octavia St. Laurent, American trans woman and performer.
Al Tornabene, 86, American mobster.

18
Wayne Allwine, 62, American voice artist (Mickey Mouse).
Carole Cole, 64, American actress (Sanford and Son, Grady), daughter of Nat King Cole, lung cancer.
Dolla, 21, American rap artist, shot.
Sir David Hay, 92, Australian public servant, Ambassador to the United Nations, Administrator of Papua New Guinea.
K. Pattabhi Jois, 93, Indian yoga teacher, after short illness.
Paul Parin, 92, Swiss psychoanalyst, author and ethnologist.
Türkan Saylan, 74, Turkish doctor, cancer.
Lee Solters, 89, American press agent, natural causes.
Either killed in a missile attack or shot:
Balasingham Nadesan, Sri Lankan rebel, political chief of the Liberation Tigers of Tamil Eelam (LTTE).
Velupillai Prabhakaran, 54, Sri Lankan rebel, leader of the LTTE.
Thillaiyampalam Sivanesan (aka "Colonel Soosai"), 45, Sri Lankan rebel, leader of the LTTE naval wing (Sea Tigers).
Shanmugalingam Sivashankar (aka "Pottu Amman"), Sri Lankan rebel, leader of the LTTE intelligence wing.

19
Michael Preston Barr, 82, American composer, diabetes.
Robert F. Furchgott, 92, American scientist, Nobel Prize winner.
Andrei Ivanov, 42, Russian footballer.
Knut Hammer Larsen, 38, Norwegian footballer, leukemia.
Nicholas Maw, 73, British composer (Odyssey), heart failure.
Clint Smith, 95, Canadian ice hockey player (New York Rangers, Chicago Blackhawks).
Herbert York, 87, American physicist.

20
John Brown Jr., 88, American Navajo code talker.
Arthur Erickson, 84, Canadian architect (Simon Fraser University, Roy Thomson Hall).
Lucy Gordon, 28, British actress (Spider-Man 3, The Four Feathers), suicide by hanging.
Alan Kelly, Sr., 72, Irish footballer (Preston North End, Republic of Ireland), cancer.
Matthew Krel, 64, Russian-born Australian conductor, founder of the SBS Youth Orchestra, encephalitis.
Randi Lindtner Næss, 104, Norwegian actress.
* Nguyễn Bá Cẩn, Vietnamese politician, Prime Minister of South Vietnam (1975).
Simon Oates, 77, British actor, prostate cancer.
Larry Rice, 63, American racing driver, lung cancer.
María Amelia López Soliño, 97, Spanish blogger, world's oldest blogger.
Noel Stanton, 82, British founder of The Jesus Army.
Paul Vinar, 69, Australian footballer.
Ralph D. Winter, 84, American missionary (U.S. Center for World Mission), multiple myeloma and lymphoma.
Oleg Yankovsky, 65, Russian actor, pancreatic cancer.
Yehoshua Zettler, 91, Israeli resistance fighter (Lehi).
Jerzy Zubrzycki, 89, Polish-born Australian sociologist.

21
Ghader Abdollahzadeh, 83, Kurdish traditional musician.
Joan Alexander, 94, American radio actress (The Adventures of Superman), intestinal blockage.
Walter da Silva, 68, Brazilian footballer and coach, heart attack.
Fathi Eljahmi, 68, Libyan political activist, blood infection.
Barry England, 77, British novelist and playwright.
Anatoli Kirilov, 42, Bulgarian football coach (PFC Spartak Varna), car accident.
Him Mark Lai, 83, American historian, bladder cancer.
Sam Maloof, 93, American woodworker, pneumonia.
Rolf McPherson, 96, American evangelist, son of Aimee Semple McPherson, natural causes.
Robert Müller, 28, German ice hockey player, brain cancer.
Kanagasabai Pathmanathan, 64, Sri Lankan politician.
Togo Tanaka, 93, American journalist, natural causes.

22
Alexander Mezhirov, 86, Russian poet.
Zé Rodrix, 61, Brazilian musician.
*Yeo Woon Kye, 69, South Korean actress, kidney cancer.

23
Charles Albury, 88, American co-pilot of the Bockscar at atomic bombing of Nagasaki, heart failure.
Sir Derek Bowett, 82, British academic lawyer, President of Queens' College, Cambridge (1970–1982).
Raleigh Brown, 87, American politician, state representative (Texas), heart attack.
Lawrence Daly, 84, British trade union leader.
Joseph Duval, 80, French Roman Catholic prelate, Archbishop of Rouen (1981–2004).
Ken Gill, 81, British trade union leader.
David Lunceford, 75, American football player, Alzheimer's disease.
Nicholas J. Phillips, 75, British physicist.
Tadeusz Pyka, 79, Polish politician.
*Roh Moo-hyun, 62, South Korean politician, President (2003–2008), suicide by jumping.
Sir Tangaroa Tangaroa, 88, Cook Islands public servant, Queen's Representative (1985–1990).

24
Jay Bennett, 45, American musician (Wilco) and songwriter, accidental drug overdose.
Jack Lewis, 84, American screenwriter, lung cancer.

25
Tajudeen Abdul-Raheem, 48, Nigerian Pan African activist, car accident.
Billy Baxter, 70, Scottish footballer (Ipswich Town), cancer.
Rolf Brahde, 91, Norwegian astronomer.
Amos Elon, 82, Austrian-born Israeli author and journalist.
Charly Höllering, 65, German jazz musician, heart attack.
Haakon Lie, 103, Norwegian politician.
Tomás Paquete, 85, Portuguese Olympic sprinter.
Ivan van Sertima, 74, Guyanese-born British historian, linguist and anthropologist (Rutgers University).

26
Antonio Braga, 80, Italian composer.
Thomas Claw, 87, American WWII Navajo Code talker.
Commanche Court, 16, Irish thoroughbred racehorse, euthanized.
Kaoru Kurimoto, 56, Japanese author, pancreatic cancer.
Doris Mühringer, 88, Austrian poet and children's writer.
Mihalis Papagiannakis, 68, Greek politician, MP, cancer.
Michael Ross, 89, American screenwriter and director (Three's Company), complications from a heart attack and stroke.
Ronald Takaki, 70, American sociologist, professor of ethnic studies (University of California, Berkeley), suicide.
Marek Walczewski, 72, Polish actor.
Peter Zezel, 44, Canadian ice hockey player (Philadelphia Flyers, Toronto Maple Leafs), haemolytic anemia.

27
Ammo Baba, 74, Iraqi footballer and athletic trainer, diabetes.
Thomas Franck, 77, American lawyer.
Sir Clive Granger, 74, British economist, Nobel Prize winner for economics.
Eugene F. Grant, 68, American attorney and politician, Mayor of Medford (1978–1980), leukaemia.
Mona Grey, 98, British public servant, Chief Nursing Officer for Northern Ireland.
Abram Hoffer, 92, Canadian orthomolecular psychiatrist.
Gérard Jean-Juste, 62, Haitian political activist, after long illness.
Carol Anne O'Marie, 75, American Roman Catholic nun and mystery novelist, Parkinson's disease.
Sir William Refshauge, 96, Australian public health administrator.
Paul Sharratt, 75, British-born American television producer, cancer.

28
Mort Abrahams, 93, American film and television producer (Planet of the Apes, The Man from U.N.C.L.E.), natural causes.
Terence Alexander, 86, British film and television actor (Bergerac).
Terry Barr, 73, American football player (Detroit Lions), Alzheimer's disease.
Manuel Collantes, 91, Filipino diplomat, Acting Minister of Foreign Affairs (1984), cardiac arrest.
Ed Dorohoy, 80, Canadian ice hockey player.
Carlton Forbes, 72, Jamaican-born British first-class cricketer.
Roger Kaffer, 81, American Roman Catholic prelate, Bishop of Joliet.
Luis María de Larrea y Legarreta, 91, Spanish Roman Catholic prelate, Bishop of Bilbao.
Lenrie Peters, 76, Gambian surgeon and novelist, after short illness.
Ercole Rabitti, 87, Italian footballer and trainer.
Oleg Shenin, 71, Russian politician, member of the Politburo of the Communist Party of the Soviet Union (1990–1991).
Umberto Silvestri, 93, Italian Olympic wrestler.
Betty Tancock, 98, Canadian Olympic swimmer (1932).
John Tolos, 78, Canadian professional wrestler, renal failure.

29
Hank Bassen, 76, Canadian ice hockey player (Detroit Red Wings), heart attack.
Kevin Beurle, 53, British scientist, hot air balloon accident.
Reginald Golledge, 71, Australian-born American geographer.
Phale Hale, 94, American politician, member of the Ohio House of Representatives.
Ed Murray, 80, American politician, speaker of the Tennessee House of Representatives (1987–1991).
Bill Perkins, 89, Australian footballer (Richmond).
Steve Prest, 43, British snooker player and coach, peritonitis.
Karine Ruby, 31, French Olympic gold (1998) and silver (2002) medal-winning snowboarder, fall.
Matt Zabitka, 88, American sportswriter.

30
Torsten Andersson, 82, Swedish painter.
Krystyna Borowicz, 86, Polish actress.
Luís Cabral, 78, Guinea-Bissauan politician, President (1973–1980).
Eva Dawes, 96, Canadian bronze medal-winning Olympic high jumper (1932), stroke.
Roberto Falaschi, 77, Italian cyclist.
Susanna Haapoja, 42, Finnish politician, cerebral haemorrhage.
Eric Hammond, 79, British trade unionist, General Secretary of the EETPU.
Ephraim Katzir, 93, Israeli biophysicist and politician, President (1973–1978).
Herma Kirchschläger, 93, Austrian widow of former President Rudolf Kirchschläger.
Waldemar Matuška, 76, Czech singer, pneumonia and heart failure.
Gaafar Nimeiry, 79, Sudanese politician, President (1969–1985).
Alexander Obregón, 32, Colombian footballer, car accident.

31
Martin Clemens, 94, British colonial administrator and soldier.
Brian Edrich, 86, British cricketer.
Sir John Holland, 94, Australian engineer, construction magnate.
Danny La Rue, 81, Irish-born British female impersonator and singer, prostate cancer.
Vyacheslav Nevinny, 74, Russian actor, diabetes.
Emil L. Smith, 97, American biochemist, heart attack.
Kamala Surayya, 75, Indian writer, after long illness.
George Tiller, 67, American physician and abortion provider, shot.

References

2009-05
 05